Bentartia is a genus of marine ray-finned fish belonging to the family Zoarcidae, the eelpouts. Some authorities treat this genus as monospecific, with the only species being Bentartia cinerea of the Southern Ocean, but other authorities include 4 species from the eastern Pacific Ocean.

Taxonomy
This genus is classified within the subfamily Lycodinae, one of 4 subfamilies in the family Zoarcidae, the eelpouts.

Etymology
Bentartia is named after BENTART, the Spanish expeditions to the Antarctic, the holotype of B. cinerea was collected during these expeditions.

Species
Fishbase only recognises one species, B. cinerea, within the genus but other authorities recognise the following species:

The other three species are included in Bothrocara by Fishbase.

Distribution and habitat
Bentartia, as B. cinerea, was originally described from the Gerlache Strait. The other species which have since been assigned to this genus are found in the eastern Pacific between the Bering Strait in the north and Chile in the south. They are bathydemersal and bathypelagic fishes.

References

Lycodinae
Fish described in 2010